Antigua and Barbuda competed at the 2016 Summer Olympics in Rio de Janeiro, Brazil, from 5 to 21 August 2016. This was the nation's tenth appearance at the Summer Olympics.

The Antigua and Barbuda Olympic Association sent the nation's largest roster to the Games for the first time since 1996. A total of nine athletes, seven men and two women, were selected to compete only in athletics and swimming, due to the presence of the men's 4 × 100 m relay team. Being the most experienced member of the team, sprinter Daniel Bailey was appointed to carry the nation's flag for the third time in the opening ceremony.

Antigua and Barbuda, however, has yet to win its first ever Olympic medal.

Athletics (track and field)
 
Athletes from Antigua and Barbuda have so far achieved qualifying standards in the following athletics events (up to a maximum of 3 athletes in each event):

Track & road events

Field events

Swimming

Antigua and Barbuda has received a Universality invitation from FINA to send two swimmers (one male and one female) to the Olympics.

See also
Antigua and Barbuda at the 2015 Pan American Games

References

External links 
 

Nations at the 2016 Summer Olympics
2016
Olympics